Stanley Gifford "Giff" Nielsen (born October 25, 1954) is a former American football quarterback who played professionally for the Houston Oilers of the National Football League (NFL). He was the sports director of KHOU in Houston from 1984 until March 31, 2009. He has been a general authority of the Church of Jesus Christ of Latter-day Saints (LDS Church) since April 2013.

Football career

High school career
Nielsen grew up in Provo, Utah, and attended Provo High School, playing as the school's quarterback.

College career
Nielsen remained in Provo and attended Brigham Young University, where he was an All-American quarterback for the Cougars under head coach LaVell Edwards. He was inducted into the College Football Hall of Fame in 1994.

NFL career
Nielsen was selected in the third round of the 1978 NFL Draft (73rd overall) by the Houston Oilers, the team with which he spent his entire NFL career, six seasons as a part-time quarterback. 

Nielsen served as backup to Dan Pastorini in 1978 and 1979 and to Ken Stabler in 1980 and 1981. He played the most games in his last two seasons, 1982–1983, when he shared quarterbacking duties with Archie Manning and Oliver Luck. 

From 1984 to 1987, he served as a color commentator on Oilers radio broadcasts.

TV Sports Anchor
Nielsen was the Sports Director at CBS affiliate KHOU in Houston from 1984 to 2009.  He also made an appearance in P.D.Q. Bach in Houston: We Have a Problem! as a color commentator alongside Peter Schickele during a sketch of Beethoven's Fifth, in which the performance was done as if it were a mock football/hockey game.

LDS Church service
Nielsen has served in the LDS Church in many capacities, including elders quorum president, bishop, president of the Houston Texas South Stake, mission president's counselor, and area seventy. He was released as an area seventy on April 6, 2013, and called as a general authority and member of the First Quorum of the Seventy. Among his assignments, Nielsen served for a time in the presidency of the church's Pacific Area. Since August 2019, Nielsen has been the president of the church's North America Central Area.

Scouting 100 year Anniversary
Nielsen was the master of ceremonies at the "100 Years of Scouting" celebration at Minute Maid Park in Texas.

See also
 List of college football yearly passing leaders

References

External links
 "General Authorities: S. Gifford Nielsen", churchofjesuschrist.org.
 "Elder S. Gifford Nielsen", Liahona, May 2013.

 

1954 births
Living people
American football quarterbacks
BYU Cougars football players
BYU Cougars men's basketball players
Houston Oilers players
National Football League announcers
All-American college football players
College Football Hall of Fame inductees
Area seventies (LDS Church)
American general authorities (LDS Church)
Members of the First Quorum of the Seventy (LDS Church)
Provo High School alumni
Players of American football from Houston
Sportspeople from Provo, Utah
Players of American football from Utah
Brigham Young University alumni
Latter Day Saints from Utah
Latter Day Saints from Texas
American men's basketball players